F25 may refer to:

Vehicles 
Aircraft
 Fokker F.25, a Dutch passenger monoplane

Automobiles
 BMW X3 (F25), a German SUV

Ships
 , a Mariscal Sucre-class frigate of the Venezuelan Navy
 , an Ulsan-class frigate of the Bangladesh Navy
 , a submarine depot ship of the Royal Navy
 , a Kasturi-class corvette of the Royal Malaysian Navy

Other uses 
 Feuerlilie F-25, a German anti-aircraft missile
 Fluorine-25 (25F), an isotope of fluorine
 Getrag F25 transmission, a General Motors transmission
 Schizoaffective disorder